The Los Angeles Religious Education Congress (RECongress)  is a four-day event held by the Roman Catholic Archdiocese of Los Angeles. The event began in 1956 as an "Institute" of the Confraternity of Christian Doctrine, popularly known as CCD. In 1967, the first three-day “Congress” was held. In 1970, the event moved to the Anaheim Convention Center in Anaheim, California. It is the largest annual gathering of Catholics in the United States with roughly 40,000 people attending. The focus of the RECongress is for those in attendance to learn more about the Catholic faith as well as seeking personal growth. It is open to all people of different faiths.

Dates & Themes
RECongress 2023 - February 24-26, 2023 - "Embrace Grace" / "Abraza la Gracia" / "Ấp ủ hồng ân"
Youth Day 2023 (February 23, 2023) - "Strive 4 Life"
RECongress 2022 - March 18-20, 2022 - "Living Waters of Hope" / "Aguas Vivas de Esperanza" / "Nguồn Nước của Hy Vọng"
Youth Day 2022 (March 17, 2022) - "Let God Take the Wheel"
RECongress 2022 will return to Anaheim and offer both an in-person and virtual experience
RECongress 2021 - February 18-21, 2021 - "Proclaim the Promise!" / "¡Proclama la Promesa!" / "Tuyên Xưng Lời Giao Ước”
2021 is the first virtual event; Youth Day is held as Youth Day Track on Friday & Saturday from 2:30-5 pm
RECongress 2020 - February 21-23, 2020 - "Live Mercy – Be Holy” / “Vive la misericordia y la santidad” / “Sống Nhân Từ - Hãy Nên Thánh” 
Youth Day 2020 (February 20, 2020) - "20/20 Through God's Eyes"
RECongress 2019 -  March 22-24, 2019 - "Thirsting for Justice” | “Sed de Justicia” | “Khát Khao Công Lý” 
Youth Day (March 21, 2019) - "Trust! God’s Gotchu"
March 21, 2019 (Youth Day)"Rise Up!" / "¡Levántate!" / "Hãy Đứng Lên!"

March 16–18, 2018 – "Rise Up!" / "¡Levántate!" / "Hãy Đứng Lên!"
Youth Day 2018 (March 15, 2018) – "Dare to Believe"
February 24–26, 2017 – "Embrace Trust" / "¡Confía!"
Youth Day 2017 (February 23, 2017) – "What Are You Waiting For?"
February 26–28, 2016 – "Boundless Mercy" / "Misericordia Inagotable"
Youth Day 2016 (February 25, 2016) – "#hopebound"
March 13–15, 2015 – "See" / "Ver"
Youth Day 2015 (March 12, 2015) – "Talk Jesus with Me"
March 14–16, 2014 – "Hope: A World Afire" / "Esperanza que Enciende al Mundo"
Youth Day 2014 (March 13, 2014) – "Never Alone, Forever Accepted!"
February 22–24, 2013 – "Enter the Mystery" / "Entra al Misterio"
Youth Day 2013 (February 21, 2013) – "Keep Calm – God's Got This"
March 23–25, 2012 – "Voice Infusing Life" / "Voz que Infunde Vida"
Youth Day 2012 (March 22, 2012) – "Called Out: Challenge Accepted"
March 18–20, 2011 – "Hold Firm...Trust!" / "Mantente Firme ... ¡Confía!"
Youth Day 2011 (March 17, 2011) – "Godbook: Everyone Invited"
March 19–21, 2010 – "Incredible Abundance" / "Increíble Abundancia"
Youth Day 2010 (March 18, 2010) – "I'm Just Sayin'..."
February 27-March 1, 2009 – "Love Unfolding ... Igniting our Yes!" / "Amor Revelador ... Encendiendo nuestro ¡Sí!"
Youth Day 2009 (February 26, 2009) – "Step Up and Live!"
February 29-March 2, 2008 – "Lift Your Gaze ... See Anew!" / "¡Alza tu Mirada ... Vuelve a Mirar!"
Youth Day 2008 (February 28, 2008) – "About Face"
March 2–4, 2007 – "Stand in the Light" / "Permanecer en la luz"
Youth Day 2007 (March 1, 2007) – "LOL: Live Out Love"
March 31-April 2, 2006 – "Step into Freedom" / "Paso a la Libertad"
Youth Day 2006 (March 30, 2006) – "Stand Up, Never Forget"
February 18–20, 2005 – "Awake to Grace" / "Despierten a la Gracia"
Youth Day 2005 (February 17, 2005) – "Ask, Seek, Knock"
February 20–22, 2004 – "Steeped in Mercy, Balm for the World" / "Inmersos en Misericordia, Bálsamo para el Mundo"
Youth Day 2004 (February 19, 2004) – "You Think You Know, But You Have No Idea!"
2004 is the first year Youth Day adopts its own theme.
February 27-March 2, 2003 – "Bearer of Hope, Restoring Spirit" / "Portador de Esperanza, Restaurando el Espíritu"

February 14–17, 2002 – "Gift Overflowing, A World Transformed" / "Don Derramado, Mundo Transformado"

February 15–18, 2001 – "Clothed in Love, Summoned Beyond" / "Vestidos en Amor, Llamados al más allá"

April 6–9, 2000 – "Embrace Hope: Shout Jubilee!" / "Despierta la Esperanza: Grita Jubileo"

February 11–14, 1999 – "Lead with Eyes of Wisdom" / "Dirige con Ojos de Sabiduría"

February 19–22, 1998 – "Imaging Love: Empowering Lives" / "Reflejando Amor: Dando Poder"

February 13–16, 1997 – "Embrace and Echo the Word" / "Abraza y Haz Eco la Palabra"

March 21–24, 1996 – "God's Liberating Power" / "Poder Liberador de Dios"

February 16–19, 1995 – "Passion for Justice" / "Pasión por la Justicia"

February 17–20, 1994 – "Live the Promise" / "Vive la Promesa"

February 18–21, 1993 – "Compassion Poured Out" / "Compasión Derramada"

March 19–22, 1992 – "On Holy Ground" / "En Tierra Santa"

February 14–17, 1991 – "Waters of the Earth" / "Aguas de la Tierra"

January 25–28, 1990 – "Voices that Challenge" / "Voces que Desafían"

April 20–23, 1989 – "Proclaim God's Glory" / "Proclama la Gloria de Dios"

March 10–13, 1988 – "We are God's Work of Art" / "Somos Obra de Arte de Dios"

March 12–15, 1987 – "Sent to be a Blessing" / "Enviados a ser una Benedición"

February 13–16, 1986 – "The Word is in Your Heart" / "La Palabra está en su Corazón"

January 24–27, 1985 – "Journey Together in Faith" / "Caminar Juntos en Fe"

March 22–25, 1984 – "The Lord is With Us" / "El Señor está con Nosotros"

March 17–20, 1983 – "Making all Things New in Christ" / "Haciendo Todas las Cosas Nuevas en Cristo"

February 11–14, 1982 – "Growing in Age, Wisdom, Favor" / "Creciendo Edad, Sabiuría, Favor"

February 12–15, 1981 – "Many Gifts -- One Lord" / "Diversos Dones pero un solo Señor"

March 6–9, 1980 – "Family Together in His Love" / "Familia Unida por su Amor"

February 1–4, 1979 – "He Calls Us Each By Name" / "¡Nos Llama por Nuestro Nombre"

February 2–5, 1978 – "Doing the Truth in Love" / "Hacer la Verdad en el Amor"

1978 is the first year the theme is both in English and Spanish.

February 10–13, 1977 – "Come Follow Me"

February 12–15, 1976 – "Free to Live"

February 27-March 2, 1975 – "Praise, Pilgrim & Rejoice "

February 7–10, 1974 – "Jesus, Others, You "

March 1–4, 1973 – "Who Do You Say I Am?

In 1973 the "CCD Congress" is renamed the "Religious Education Congress."

February 18–20, 1972 – "CCD Congress Jubilee"

March 26–28, 1971 – "You Shall be my Witnesses to the ends of the Earth" - Acts 1:8

In 1971 the first Youth Rally was held, which set the pattern for Youth Day.

February 20–22, 1970 – "CCD Congress": "That All May Be One"

'In 1970 the Confraternity of Christian Doctrine (CCD) Congress relocates to the Anaheim (Calif.) Convention Center.'

February 21–23, 1969 – "CCD Congress"

February 2–4, 1968 – "Confraternity Congress"

January 13–15, 1967 – "Southern California Confraternity Congress"

In 1967, the first "Southern California Confraternity Congress" was held at the LAX-area International Hotel.

Earlier Dates
1958-1966 – Held at Loyola University or Immaculate Heart College

1957 – Held at Bishop Conaty Catholic Girls High School

1956 – First CCD institute held at Mount Carmel High School on Hoover Street in Los Angeles.

External links
Official Religious Education Congress web site

Roman Catholic Archdiocese of Los Angeles
Annual events in California
Education events
Catholic education